Sky High Corral is a 1926 American silent Western film directed by Clifford Smith and starring Art Acord, Marguerite Clayton and Duke R. Lee.

Cast
 Art Acord as Jack McCabe 
 Marguerite Clayton as Shasta Hayden 
 Duke R. Lee as Whitey Durk 
 Jack Mower as Burns 
 Thomas G. Lingham as Bill Hayden
 Blackie Thompson as Gregg 
 Missouri Royer as Slim 
 Floyd Shackelford as Sam

References

Bibliography
 Munden, Kenneth White. The American Film Institute Catalog of Motion Pictures Produced in the United States, Part 1. University of California Press, 1997.

External links
 

1926 films
1926 Western (genre) films
Universal Pictures films
Films directed by Clifford Smith
American black-and-white films
Silent American Western (genre) films
1920s English-language films
1920s American films